Friedrich Donenfeld (17 January 1912 – 20 March 1976) was an Austrian professional football player and manager.

He played for Thalia Wien, Hakoah Vienna, Maccabi Tel Aviv, Olympique de Marseille and Red Star F.C.

He coached the Colombia national football team, Atlético Junior, the Netherlands national football team, Fortuna Sittard, DHC, Enschedese Boys, VV DOS, FC Twente, MVV and PEC Zwolle, among others.

References

External links 
 Profile – om1899

1912 births
1976 deaths
Association football forwards
Jewish footballers
Austria international footballers
Austrian footballers
Austrian football managers
Austrian expatriate football managers
SC Hakoah Wien footballers
Maccabi Tel Aviv F.C. players
Austrian expatriate sportspeople in Israel
Olympique de Marseille players
Austrian expatriate footballers
Austrian expatriate sportspeople in France
Expatriate footballers in France
Red Star F.C. players
Ligue 1 players
Austrian expatriate sportspeople in Colombia
Colombia national football team managers
Austrian expatriate sportspeople in the Netherlands
ADO Den Haag managers
Netherlands national football team managers
FC Twente managers
MVV Maastricht managers
PEC Zwolle managers
Atlético Junior managers
Expatriate football managers in Colombia
Expatriate football managers in the Netherlands
Austrian Jews
Footballers from Vienna
VV DOS managers
DHC Delft managers